Nyyrikki is the Finnish god of the hunt and cattle, and son of Tapio and Mielikki. He has been tenuously associated with Nimrod.

References

Finnish gods
Hunting gods
Characters in the Kalevala
Nimrod